Fulghum is a surname. Notable people with the surname include:

Dot Fulghum (1900–1947), American baseball player
Jim Fulghum (1944–2014), American politician and physician
Luke Fulghum (born 1980), American ice hockey player
Robert Fulghum (born 1937), American writer